The Governor General's Award for English-language non-fiction is a Canadian literary award that annually recognizes one Canadian writer for a non-fiction book written in English. Since 1987 it is one of fourteen Governor General's Awards for Literary Merit, seven each for creators of English- and French-language books. Originally presented by the Canadian Authors Association, the Governor General's Awards program became a project of the Canada Council for the Arts in 1959.

The program was created in 1937 and inaugurated that November for 1936 publications in two English-language categories, conventionally called the 1936 Governor General's Awards. Beginning in 1942 there were two winners annually, with separate awards presented for creative non-fiction and academic non-fiction; however, this was discontinued after the 1958 awards, and then returned to a single non-fiction category.

The winners alone were announced until 1979, when Canada Council released in advance a shortlist of three nominees. Since then, the advance shortlist has numbered three to five.

Winners and nominees

1930s

1940s

1950s

1960s

1970s

1980s

1990s

2000s

2010s

2020s

References

External links
 Governor General award winners at Faded Page

English
Awards established in 1936
1936 establishments in Canada
Canadian non-fiction literary awards
Non-fiction

English-language literary awards